James Cummings may refer to:

 James Cummings (Ontario politician) (1815–1894), Canadian politician
 James Cummings (police officer) (1878–1976), New Zealand policeman and police commissioner
 James H. Cummings (1890–1979), politician from Tennessee
 James M. Cummings, sheriff of Barnstable County, Massachusetts
 James G. Cummings, American white supremacist found with  material for a dirty bomb
 Jim Cummings (born 1952), American voice actor and singer
 Jim Cummings (filmmaker) (born 1986), American actor and filmmaker
 Jimmy Cummings (born 1968), American actor and CEO of Broadview Entertainment
 Bart Cummings (James Bartholomew Cummings, 1927–2015), Australian racehorse trainer
 Glen Cummings (politician) (James Glen Cummings, born 1944), politician from Manitoba, Canada

See also
James Cummins (disambiguation)
Jim Cummins (disambiguation)